Kateryna Serdyuk may refer to:

 Kateryna Serdyuk (archer) (born 1983), Ukrainian archer
 Kateryna Serdyuk (skier) (born 1989), Ukrainian cross-country skier